Wang Xiaoqian (born 1996) is a Chinese freestyle wrestler. In 2019, she won one of the bronze medals in the women's 65 kg event at the 2019 World Wrestling Championships held in Nur-Sultan, Kazakhstan.

Career 

In 2014, she competed in the women's freestyle 63 kg event at the 2014 World Wrestling Championships held in Tashkent, Uzbekistan. In 2017, she won one of the bronze medals in the 63 kg event at the 2017 Asian Wrestling Championships held in New Delhi, India. In 2018, she won one of the bronze medals in the 72 kg event at the 2018 World U23 Wrestling Championship held in Bucharest, Romania.

At the 2019 World U23 Wrestling Championship held in Budapest, Hungary, she won the silver medal in the 72 kg event.

Major results

References

External links 
 

Living people
1996 births
Place of birth missing (living people)
Chinese female sport wrestlers
World Wrestling Championships medalists
21st-century Chinese women